Bryan Forbes CBE (born John Theobald Clarke; 22 July 1926 – 8 May 2013) was an English film director, screenwriter, film producer, actor and novelist described as a "Renaissance man" and "one of the most important figures in the British film industry".

He directed the film The Stepford Wives (1975) and wrote and/or directed several other critically acclaimed films, including Whistle Down the Wind (1961), Séance on a Wet Afternoon (1964) and King Rat (1965). He also scripted several films directed by others, such as The League of Gentlemen (1960), The Angry Silence (1960) and  Only Two Can Play (1962).

Early life 
Forbes was born John Theobald Clarke on 22 July 1926 in Queen Mary's Hospital, Stratford, West Ham, London. His father was a salesman and he grew up at 43 Cranmer Road, Forest Gate, where he attended West Ham Secondary School and Horncastle Grammar School after he was evacuated during the Second World War to Porthleven in Cornwall to the vicar Canon Edward Thornton Gotto and his wife. A schoolfriend at West Ham was artist Albert Herbert. Lionel Gamlin of the BBC took him on as the host of Junior Brains Trust, and invented Clarke's pseudonym of Bryan Forbes.

Career

Actor and screenwriter 
Forbes trained as an actor at the Royal Academy of Dramatic Art from age 17, but completed only three terms. He completed four years of military service in the Intelligence Corps and Combined Forces Entertainment Unit, during which time he started to write short stories. After completing his military service in 1948, following British Equity rules, he was obliged to change his name to avoid confusion with actor John Clark. Forbes began to act, appearing on stage and playing numerous supporting roles in British films, in particular An Inspector Calls (1954) and The Colditz Story (1955).

He published a short story collection in the early 1950s, which induced producer "Cubby" Broccoli to offer him screenwriting work on The Black Knight (1954). He received his first credit for Second World War film The Cockleshell Heroes (1955), while other early screenplays include I Was Monty's Double (1958), and The League of Gentlemen (1960), his breakthrough. Directed by Basil Dearden, Forbes also starred. The film recounted a bank heist carried out by ex-army officers, and gained critical success, including his first BAFTA nomination.

In 1959, he formed a production company, Beaver Films, with his frequent collaborator Richard Attenborough. Beaver Films made The Angry Silence (1960), a controversial screenplay by Forbes in which Attenborough took the lead role, and the two men shared production responsibilities.

Film director 
Forbes's directorial debut came with Whistle Down the Wind (1961), again produced by Attenborough, a critically acclaimed film about three northern children who conceal a criminal in their barn, believing him to be a reincarnated Jesus Christ. It starred child actor Hayley Mills and Alan Bates, in one of his earliest film roles. The film was nominated for four BAFTA awards, including Best Film from any Source. It was the basis for a 1996 musical by Andrew Lloyd Webber. The L-Shaped Room (1962), his next film as director, with Leslie Caron in the female lead, led to her gaining a nomination for an Oscar, and winning the BAFTA (Best British Actress) and Golden Globe awards. Comments Phil Wickham: "It feels like half a new wave film – a mid-point between the innovation of the Woodfall Films and the mainstream of the British film industry."

Forbes wrote and directed Séance on a Wet Afternoon (1964), and the same year he wrote the third screen adaptation of the Somerset Maugham novel Of Human Bondage. In 1965, he went to Hollywood to make King Rat, a successful prisoner-of-war story. He followed this with The Wrong Box (1966) and The Whisperers (1967), the latter featuring Edith Evans. A caper film, Deadfall (1968), starred Michael Caine.

Head of EMI Films 
In 1969, Forbes was appointed chief of production and managing director of the film studio Associated British (soon to become EMI Films). Dennis Barker, in his obituary of Forbes for The Guardian, states, 'This amounted virtually to an attempt to revive the ailing British film industry by instituting a traditional studio system with a whole slate of films in play.'  Under Forbes's leadership, the studio produced The Railway Children (1970), The Tales of Beatrix Potter (1971) and The Go-Between (1971), all successful. His tenure, though, was marked by financial problems and failed projects, and he resigned in 1971.

Coinciding with his time at EMI Films, he resumed directorial work with The Raging Moon (1971), starring his wife, Nanette Newman, and Malcolm McDowell.

Later career 
From the early 1970s, Forbes divided his energies between cinema, television, theatre, and writing. In 1972 he started work on the documentary Elton John and Bernie Taupin Say Goodbye Norma Jean and Other Things (1973), which chronicled the life of the young Elton John and Bernie Taupin. Taking a full year to complete, the project gave a behind-the-scenes look at the writing and recording of Goodbye Yellow Brick Road. Besides footage of John's 1973 Hollywood Bowl concert, the film included interviews with John, Taupin, and band members, including Nigel Olsson and Dee Murray, as well as John's mother, Sheila, DJM label chief Dick James, and James's son, Stephen. (Some of the concert footage was later licensed for the Eagle Vision Classic Albums series Goodbye Yellow Brick Road documentary.) During filming, Forbes formed a close friendship with John and Taupin, which led to other collaborations with them, including photography on the Don't Shoot Me I'm Only the Piano Player and Goodbye Yellow Brick Road album sleeves. ITV broadcast the documentary in the UK on 4 December 1973, and it was later briefly issued on VHS. It was shown in the U.S. on ABC.

Forbes returned to Hollywood to direct The Stepford Wives (1975), based on Ira Levin's novel of the same name. The thriller about the backlash against the Women's Liberation Movement in the U.S., in which Newman had a supporting role, was to become Forbes's best-known film, partly because of the protests against it. Forbes clashed with screenwriter William Goldman over casting decisions and changes to the film's ending made by Forbes, causing Goldman to drop out of the project (while retaining the screenplay credit). Despite its notoriety, The Stepford Wives received mixed reviews and performed weakly at the box office. His subsequent films as a director were less successful: The Slipper and the Rose (1976), with David Frost as executive producer; International Velvet (1978), intended as a continuation of National Velvet (1944), with Newman in the same role as Elizabeth Taylor in the earlier film; Better Late than Never (1983); and The Naked Face (1984). His final film as a screenwriter was Chaplin in 1992.

He served as president of the National Youth Theatre, Writers' Guild of Great Britain and the Beatrix Potter Society.

For a time Forbes owned a bookshop in Virginia Water, Surrey.

Author 
Forbes wrote two volumes of autobiography and several successful novels, the last of which, The Soldier's Story, was published in 2012. He was a regular contributor to The Spectator magazine.

Awards and honours 
Forbes's 1960 screenplay, The Angry Silence, won a BAFTA award, and was nominated for an Oscar. Only Two Can Play won Best British Comedy Screenplay of the Writers Guild of Great Britain in 1962. Séance on a Wet Afternoon won a 1965 Edgar Award from the Mystery Writers of America for Best Foreign Film and the 1964 Best British Dramatic Screenplay of the Writers Guild of Great Britain. Hopscotch won the Best Comedy Adapted from Another Medium of the Writers Guild of America in 1980.

Forbes's directorial debut, Whistle Down the Wind, was nominated for several BAFTA awards, including Best Film from any Source and Best British Film in 1962. Four of his other films were also nominated for BAFTA awards: The League of Gentlemen (1960), Only Two Can Play (1962), Séance on a Wet Afternoon (1964) and King Rat (1965).

In 2004, Forbes was made a Commander of the Order of the British Empire for his services to the arts. In 2006, he received the Dilys Powell Award for outstanding contribution to cinema of the London Film Critics' Circle Awards. In May 2007, he was the recipient of a BAFTA tribute, celebrating his 'outstanding achievement in filmmaking'.

Personal life 
In 1951 he married Irish actress Constance Smith, and the couple travelled to Hollywood in the early 1950s. Forbes soon returned to the UK; he and Smith divorced in 1955. Forbes went on to marry actress Nanette Newman the same year. It was popularly believed that Roger Moore was their best man, but Newman denied this on the Alan Titchmarsh Show in 2011. The couple had two daughters: journalist Sarah Standing, who is married to actor John Standing, and television presenter Emma Forbes.

Forbes was diagnosed with multiple sclerosis in 1975, while working on The Slipper and the Rose; he remained in remission which he attributed to cutting out gluten and taking vitamins and oil of primrose, together with Newman's care. However, he revealed in a 2012 interview that it had been a misdiagnosis. He continued his acting, directing and screenwriting career into the early 1990s, and was still publishing novels in the 2010s.

Forbes died at his home in Virginia Water, Surrey, on 8 May 2013 at the age of 86, following a long illness. Newman-Forbes survives him.

Journalist and former Spectator editor, Matthew d'Ancona, a friend of the Forbes family, said: "Bryan Forbes was a titan of cinema, known and loved by people around the world in the film and theatre industries, and known in other fields, including politics. He is simply irreplaceable and it is wholly apt that he died surrounded by his family." Film critic Mark Kermode wrote: "Once had the fan-boyish pleasure of telling Bryan Forbes how much I loved [The] Stepford Wives. He was charming and self-effacing. A great loss."

Select filmography

As actor 
 The Small Back Room (1949) as Peterson, dying gunner
 All Over the Town (1949) as Trumble
 Dear Mr. Prohack (1949) as Tony
 The Wooden Horse (1950) as Paul
 Green Grow the Rushes (1951) as Fred Starling – Biddle crew member
 Flesh and Fury (1952) as Fighter (uncredited)
 The World in His Arms (1952) as William Cleggett
 Appointment in London (1953) as The Brat
 Sea Devils (1953) as Willie
 Wheel of Fate (1953) as Ted Reid
 The Million Pound Note (1954) as Todd
 An Inspector Calls (1954) as Eric
 Up to His Neck (1954) as Subby
 The Colditz Story (1955) as Jimmy Winslow
 Passage Home (1955) as Shorty
 Now and Forever (1956) as Frisby
 Mabrouka (1956) as Dying Soldier (scenes deleted)
 The Baby and the Battleship (1956) as Prof. Evans
 Satellite in the Sky (1956) as Jimmy
 It's Great to Be Young (1956) as Mr. Parkes, Organ Salesman.
 The Extra Day (1956) as Harry
 Quatermass 2 (1957) as Marsh
 The Key (1958) as Weaver
 I Was Monty's Double (1958) as Young Lieutenant
 Yesterday's Enemy (1959) as Dawson
 The Angry Silence (1960) as Journalist (uncredited)
 The League of Gentlemen (1960) as Martin Porthill
 The Guns of Navarone (1961) as Cohn
 Of Human Bondage (1964) (uncredited)
 A Shot in the Dark (1964, credited as Turk Thrust) as Camp Attendant
 King Rat (1965) as Radio (voice, uncredited)
 The Slipper and the Rose (1976) as Herald (uncredited)
 International Velvet (1978) as Awards Presenter (uncredited)
 Restless Natives (1985) as Driver

As screenwriter 

 The Cockleshell Heroes (1955)
 Man in the Moon (1960)
 Station Six-Sahara (1962)
 Only Two Can Play (1962)
 Hopscotch (1980)
 Chaplin (1992)

As director 

 Whistle Down the Wind (1961)
 The L-Shaped Room (1962)
 Séance on a Wet Afternoon (1964)
 King Rat (1965)
 The Wrong Box  (1966)
 The Whisperers (1967)
 Deadfall (1968)
 The Madwoman of Chaillot (1969)
 The Raging Moon (1971)
 The Stepford Wives (1975)
 The Slipper and the Rose (1976)
 International Velvet (1978)
 Better Late Than Never (1983)
 The Naked Face (1984)

As head of EMI films 
 And Soon the Darkness (1970)
The Breaking of Bumbo (1970)
 Hoffman (1970)
Eyewitness (1970)
 The Man Who Haunted Himself (1970)
 Spring and Port Wine (1970)
 The Railway Children (1970)
 A Fine and Private Place (1970) (abandoned)
 The Go-Between (1971)
 Mr. Forbush and the Penguins (1971)
 The Tales of Beatrix Potter (1971)
 The Raging Moon (1971)
 Dulcima (1971)

Select writings

Novels 

Truth Lies Sleeping and other stories (1950)
The Distant Laughter (1972)
Slipper and the Rose (1976)
International Velvet (1978)
Familiar Strangers (1979), published as Stranger in the USA in 1980
The Rewrite Man (1983)
The Endless Game (1986)
A Song At Twilight (1989)
The Twisted Playground (1993)
Partly Cloudy (1995)
Quicksand (1996)
The Memory of All That (1999)
The Choice (2007)
The Soldier's Story (2012)

Non fiction 
Notes for a Life (1974)
Ned's Girl: The Life of Edith Evans (1977)
That Despicable Race: A History of the British Acting Tradition (1980)
A Divided Life (1992)

References 

General sources

External links 
 
 
 Britmovie article
 Forbes at hollywood.com
 Bibliography of Forbes's fiction and non-fiction
 A Tribute to Forbes, BAFTA webcast, May 2007
 Portrait by Noel Haring
The Papers of Bryan Forbes held at Churchill Archives Centre
 

1926 births
2013 deaths
Alumni of RADA
Best British Screenplay BAFTA Award winners
Commanders of the Order of the British Empire
Edgar Award winners
English film directors
English male film actors
English male screenwriters
English male stage actors
English screenwriters
Intelligence Corps soldiers
Male actors from London
National Youth Theatre members
People educated at Queen Elizabeth's Grammar School, Horncastle
People from Stratford, London
People from Virginia Water
British Army personnel of World War II